Events of 2020 in Ethiopia.

Incumbents
President: Sahle-Work Zewde
Prime Minister: Abiy Ahmed

Events

January–March
7 January – Orthodox Tewahedo Christmas in Ethiopia and Eritrea
19 January – Timkat, celebration of Epiphany in the Ethiopian and Eritrean Orthodox Tewahedo Churches
14 February – U.S. Secretary of State Mike Pompeo begins a visit to Senegal, Angola, and Ethiopia.
20 February – The Netherlands returns a stolen crown to the Government of Ethiopia.
29 February – Egypt says it will use "all means" to defend its interests in a dispute with Ethiopia and Sudan over the new dam on the Nile River.
2 March – Victory of Adwa Day
13 March – 1st case of the COVID-19 pandemic in Ethiopia
25 March – At least 60 people believed to be migrants from Ethiopia are found dead in a cargo container in Tete, Mozambique.

April–June
13 April – 14,000 cases of COVID-19 and 788 deaths have been reported across Africa. Cases by country: Comoros – 0, Djibouti – 214, Eritrea – 34, Ethiopia – 71, Kenya – 197, Madagascar – 106, Malawi – 13, Mauritius – 324, Mozambique – 21, Rwanda – 126, São Tomé and Príncipe – 4, Somalia – 25, South Sudan – 4, Tanzania – 32, Uganda – 54, Zambia – 43, Zimbabwe – 14
24 April – One million people in Ethiopia face hunger due to crop destruction by locust swarms. Swarms have been reported in Ethiopia, Eritrea, Djibouti, Somalia, Kenya, Uganda, South Sudan, and Tanzania.
8 May
Bereket Simon, former Communications Minister for the Ethiopian People's Revolutionary Democratic Front, was convicted of corruption and sentenced to six years of prison. Tadesse Kassa, a former TIRET Corporation board member, was also convicted.
A hospital in Kilembe, Uganda and a small town Somalia are washed away in flooding; an unspecified number of people are killed.
Hundreds protest when the government destroys 7,000 homes and a market in Kariobangi, Kenya.
12 May – Sudan pushes Ethiopia to resume discussion related to the $4.6 billion Grand Ethiopian Renaissance Dam on the Nile River.

July–September
1 July – 166 people are killed in protests after the death of Ethiopian singer Hachalu Hundessa.
29 August – 2020 Ethiopian general election
4 September – Elections are announced for September 8 in Tigray Region.
7 September – Journalists are banned from observing the elections in Tigray. The government says the elections are illegal.
9 September – The 2020 Tigray Regional Election is held in Tigray, even with the Government of Ethiopia condemning it.

October–December
3 November – At least dozen of peoples were massacred in ethnic violence in Gawa Qanqa, southwest Ethiopia.
4 November – "Scores, probably hundreds" of civilians are killed in Aksum in the Tigray conflict, northern Ethiopia.
7 November – The Ethiopian parliament voted to endorse the creation of an interim government for the northern Tigray region
9 November – Up to 500 civilians were alleged to have been killed in a massacre in the town of Mai Kadra. Most of the victims were Amhara people, but there are conflicting reports regarding the aggressors, Amnesty International suggesting that both Tigrayan forces and Ethiopian federal forces were involved in the massacres.
14 November – multiple rockets launched from Ethiopia hit Asmara, the capital city of Eritrea. UN Secretary-General António Guterres warns the Tigray conflict in Ethiopia may destabilize the entire Horn of Africa.
15 November – 25,000 refugees flee from Tigray, to Sudan while the Federal Ethiopian Government invades the Ethiopian region of Tigray.
17 November – Mekelle was hit by an air strike, killing two civilians and injuring several others.
18 November – The Prime Minister was reported as saying that the Ethiopian Army was advancing on Mekelle, and had captured the cities of Shire and Axum.
25 November – The Organization of African Unity sends ex-presidents Joaquim Chissano (Mozambique), Ellen Johnson Sirleaf (Liberia), and Kgalema Motlanthe (South Africa) to Addis Ababa to negotiate a peace.
27 November – The first of four United Nations humanitarian flights land in Khartoum carrying 32 tons aid from the UNHCR.
28–29 November – Seven to eight hundred civilians are massacred by the Ethiopian National Defense Force and Eritrean Army in the Aksum massacre.
8 December – Tigray conflict: Government forces shoot at and temporarily detain representatives of the United Nations as they try to reach the Tigray Region. Camps holding 100,000 refugees in Eritrea are said to be without food.
15 December – Sudan says that "Ethiopian forces and militias" ambushed Sudanese army forces near Jabal Abutiour, Sudan. Sudanese Prime Minister Abdalla Hamdok visited Ethiopia briefly on December 13 to discuss the security situation.
17 December – The U.N. pledges US$35.6 million in civilian aid for the Tigray Region, including $25 million for Ethiopia and $10.6 million in Sudan.
21 December – Tigray conflict: The African Union says the military action of the Ethiopian government in Tigray was "legitimate".
23 December – The Amhara Mass Media Agency says that dozens of people have been killed along ethnic lines in Benishangul-Gumuz Region. Attacks in September and October in the same region killed 14 and displaced 300 people.
28 December
Reuters Group cameraman Kumerra Gemechu, 36, is arrested for undisclosed reasons.
Banks reopen in Mekelle.
31 December – The government human rights commission says 76 people were killed and 200 wounded in June and July during unrest following the killing of Haacaaluu Hundeessaa. The commission said a total of 123 people were killed and at least 500 were injured.

Deaths
5 February: Abadi Hadis, 22, Olympic long-distance runner (2016 Summer Olympics).
29 June: Hachalu Hundessa, 34, singer.
8 November – Raphael Hadane, 97, Ethiopian-Israeli religious leader, Kahen of Beta Israel.
19 November – Kitilaa Guddata, 32, teacher from Sekela, Oromia Region; executed by Oromia Special Police Force.
12 December – Fikre Selassie Wogderess, 75, politician, Prime Minister (1987–1989); complications from diabetes.
17 December – Tesfaye Gessesse, 83, actor, General Director of the Hager Fikir Theatre (1974–1975).
29 December – Agitu Ideo Gudeta, 42, farmer, entrepreneur, and environmentalist

See also

Battle of Mekelle (2020)
Asmara rocket attacks
Mai Kadra massacre
Grand Ethiopian Renaissance Dam
2020 in East Africa
COVID-19 pandemic in Ethiopia
COVID-19 pandemic in Africa
Tigray conflict
Transitional Government of Tigray

References

External links
 
 Why there are fears that Ethiopia could break up (Desta Gebremedhin - BBC Tigrinya, 6 September 2020)
 Amnesty report describes Axum massacre in Ethiopia's Tigray (by Cara Anna, Associated Press, 26 February 2021)

 
2020s in Ethiopia
Years of the 21st century in Ethiopia
Ethiopia